Robert "Robs" Lamplough (born 4 June 1940 in Gloucester) is a British aviator and former racing driver from England.  He participated in four Formula One non-Championship Grands Prix, but did not race in any World Championship events. He also competed in Formula Two, and formerly competed in historic racing events.

Lamplough also collected and flew aircraft.

Racing record

Complete European Formula Two Championship results
(key)

Non-Championship Formula One results
(key)

Complete European F5000 Championship results
(key)

References

1940 births
Living people
English racing drivers
English Formula One drivers
English aviators